Silverling is a common name for several plants and may refer to:

 Baccharis glomeruliflora, native to North America
 Baccharis halimifolia, native to North America
 Paronychia argyrocoma, native to the Eastern United States